Sir William Fownes, 1st Baronet (born before 1672 – 3 April 1735) was an Anglo-Irish politician.

Fownes was the Member of Parliament for Wicklow Borough in the Irish House of Commons between 1704 and 1713. He was High Sheriff of Wicklow in 1707 and Lord Mayor of Dublin in 1708. On 26 October 1724 he was created a baronet, of Dublin in the Baronetage of Ireland. Upon his death he was succeeded in his title by his son, William Fownes.

Fownes Street in Dublin is named after him.

References

Year of birth unknown
1735 deaths
18th-century Anglo-Irish people
Baronets in the Baronetage of Ireland
High Sheriffs of Wicklow
Irish MPs 1703–1713
Lord Mayors of Dublin
Members of the Parliament of Ireland (pre-1801) for County Wicklow constituencies